Politics Now is a Scottish political programme produced and broadcast by STV in northern and central Scotland, between 2004 and 2011. The  programme, broadcast for 40 weeks of the year, on a Thursday evenings after the late STV News bulletin, covered all of the big Political developments in Westminster, Brussels and Holyrood in detail.

The programme was presented by STV's political editor Bernard Ponsonby with features reports and contributions from the rest of STV's political unit - Westminster correspondent Harry Smith, political correspondent Jamie Livingstone and freelance reporter David Torrance. The programme was originally presented by former political correspondent Michael Crow until his departure from the station in January 2009.

The series was replaced in 2011 by Scotland Tonight, which broadcast Mondays to Thursdays on STV covering current affairs and politics.

History
Prior to the creation of Politics Now, the political programmes were:
 Platform: Scottish Television Flagship political programme presented Bernard Ponsonby and Michael Crow. The series started in June 1996 as a replacement for Scottish Questions
 Crossfire: Grampain Television Flagship political programmes, which started in 1984, presented by Anne Makenzie (1984–96), John Ingram (1996–99), Michael Crow (1999-2003)

In June 1997, Scottish Television acquired Grampian Television, and from 1999, it was decided to broadcast both series on Scottish and Grampian, with Platform covering the first six months of the year, with Crossfire covering rest of the year. STV believed this would ensure viewers in both the central belt and the north of Scotland being aware of the issues which affect each part of Scotland.  In addition The Week in Politics, a weekly digest of the events of the Scottish Parliament which focuses on the work of the radical committee system in the Scottish Parliament, was introduced in 1999, to complement the two programmes.

Both achieved strong ratings, regularly attracting double the number of viewers of Newsnight Scotland.

Creation
During 2003, it became clear the Scottish political landscape had changed both fundamentally and dramatically. To better reflect the changes it was decided to overhaul the stations' political programming into a single flagship series broadcasting 40 weeks a year in a 45-minute slot, with production bases in Aberdeen, Glasgow and Edinburgh, and correspondents in London and Brussels. For 22 weeks of the year the programme came from Grampian TV's new studio in Aberdeen.

A Grampian TV spokesperson said "Our existing programmes, Crossfire and The Week in Politics have served us well and have given Grampian TV significant profile in the political community. However we believe we are now in a position to offer our viewers an even better service. Politics Now will be a brand new political programme."

The head of News and Current Affairs at Scottish TV, Paul McKinney, said: "Politics Now will aim to bring a fresh perspective on political developments across Scotland as well as tackling issues of significance at Westminster and inside the European Union. This is an exciting development for Scottish and Grampian TV. The new programme demonstrates our commitment to in depth political coverage. We hope that Politics Now will become essential viewing for anyone interested in the politics and future of our country. We also hope to bring new viewers to political programming with an innovative and accessible approach to the reporting and discussion of all the big political stories that matter across Scotland."

Axing
On 25 August 2011, STV announced plans to introduce a 30-minute current affairs programme, Scotland Tonight, on Monday through Thursday nights at 10:30 pm. The pan-regional programme, incorporating late news bulletins for STV's regions, began on Monday 24 October 2011, replacing Politics Now in its Thursday night slot.

Politics Now was broadcast from STV's headquarters at Pacific Quay in Glasgow, sharing the same set as the west opt-out on STV News at Six. Prior to 2005, the programme was broadcast from STV's former headquarters at Cowcaddens, Glasgow, and the studios of Grampian Television (now STV North) in West Tullos, Aberdeen.

References

External links
 

2004 Scottish television series debuts
2011 Scottish television series endings
Politics of Scotland
Scottish television shows
STV News